The International Frassati Path of Pollone is one of the path devoted to the blessed Pier Giorgio Frassati in Piedmont.

It starts from the village of Pollone, native place of the Frassati family, where the bl. Pier Giorgio went on vacation, and arrives as far as the altar on the Monte Muanda.

History 
For the 2000 Jubilee, the path that the bl. Pier Giorgio Frassati walked through in order to reach the Sanctuary of Oropa, after starting from the family villa in Pollone, was inaugurated.

This track climbs on the Monte Muanda as far as the feet of the Monte Mucrone, where, on a hillock (called Poggio Frassati) an altar devoted to the Blessed has been built.

Along the way there are panels with quotations of Frassati's thoughts.

See also 
 Pier Giorgio Frassati
 CoEur - In the heart of European paths
 Path of Saint Charles

References

External links
Official website

Tourist attractions in Piedmont
Hiking trails in Italy